Norristown Transportation Center is a two-level multimodal public transportation regional hub located in Norristown, Pennsylvania and operated by SEPTA. It opened in 1989, replacing the older Norristown High Speed Line (Route 100) terminus one block away at Main and Swede Streets, and integrated the former Reading Company's DeKalb Street Norristown railroad station (built 1933) into its structure. A plaque embedded in the sidewalk between the bus lane and Lafayette Street commemorates the location of one of the columns of the dismantled segment of the Philadelphia and Western Railroad (P&W) trestle.

Regional rail service
The Norristown Transportation Center is a stop on the Manayunk/Norristown Regional Rail Line which offers service to Center City Philadelphia via Conshohocken and Manayunk.

In FY 2017, the regional rail service at Norristown Transportation Center had a weekday average of 856 boardings and 781 alightings.

Norristown High Speed Line

Norristown Transportation Center is the final stop on the Norristown High Speed Line which runs from 69th Street Transportation Center in Upper Darby to Norristown.

Bus routes
In addition to rail service, NTC serves as the center of the Frontier District of SEPTA's Suburban Division bus routes, particularly the routes operating in Montgomery County. Bus routes serving NTC operate with a "timed transfer"; for the most part, buses leave at the same time, to maximize possible transfers between routes. These routes serve areas of Norristown and other areas in Montgomery County.

SEPTA Frontier District routes that serve Norristown Transportation Center are:
  - to Plymouth Meeting Mall via Penn Square
  - to SCI Phoenix via Eagleville (Saturdays only)
  - to Pottstown via Collegeville and Philadelphia Premium Outlets
 - to Lansdale via Montgomery Mall and North Wales
  - to Chestnut Hill via Barren Hill and Conshohocken
  - to Blue Bell via Plymouth Meeting Mall
  - to Phoenixville via King of Prussia Transit Center at King of Prussia mall, Audubon and Oaks
  - to Audubon and Valley Forge Corporate Complex via Jeffersonville

Norristown Transportation Center is served by theconnector shuttle bus operated by the King of Prussia District, which connects Manayunk/Norristown Line trains at the station to the business parks in King of Prussia during peak weekday hours.

NTC is located at DeKalb & Lafayette Streets near the banks of the Schuylkill River and boasts a parking garage (built in 2008). Along with the opening of the new garage, intercity bus service by Bieber Transportation Group, Greyhound, and Martz Trailways was introduced to Norristown. Bieber Transportation Group ended service to Norristown on April 1, 2018 while Martz Trailways service ended May 31, 2018.

Norristown Transportation Center was formerly an important transfer point between electric and Budd Rail Diesel Car (RDCs) service to points north, such as Valley Forge, Phoenixville, Pottstown, Reading and Pottsville. Pottsville line service was eliminated in 1981 due to budget cuts. Proposed restoration of service beyond Norristown, dubbed the Schuylkill Valley Metro, was canceled in 2006 after SEPTA failed to acquire necessary funding.

Station layout

References

External links 
 

SEPTA – Norristown Transportation Center map (archived)
 Norristown Transportation Center (The Subway Nut)
 DeKalb Street entrance from Google Maps Street View

SEPTA Regional Rail stations
SEPTA Norristown High Speed Line stations
SEPTA stations and terminals
Transport Center
Former Reading Company stations
Railway stations in Montgomery County, Pennsylvania
Railway stations in the United States opened in 1989
1989 establishments in Pennsylvania